George Martin Battersby (London, 12 February 1914 - Lewes, 3 April 1982) was a British trompe-l'œil artist and theatrical set decorator who became an expert on Art Nouveau and the style of the 1920s and 1930s.

Early career
His father was a retail jeweller but Martin was drawn to the visual arts and he first trained as a draughtsman at Gill & Reigate. Later, he worked at Liberty's and then studied acting at RADA. His stage career was eclipsed by an interest in set design and painting and his first commission was for the Old Vic production of Hamlet with Laurence Olivier in 1937. This was followed by commissions for the Royal Shakespeare Company at Stratford. A 1956 profile in The Sketch has a page portrait by Hans Wild. The writer states: "Battersby assured me that he has never in his life attended an art school, or even had any art lessons. He is entirely self-taught."

Cecil Beaton
Battersby continued to expand his experience by working in the antiques trade and buying for his own eclectic collection. In the 1940s he worked for a short time as assistant set designer to Cecil Beaton and worked on the 1945 production of Lady Windermere's Fan. He later fell out with Beaton, as he did with other collaborators.

Art
His career as an artist developed in parallel with other activities and he held his first one-man show in 1948 at the Brook Street Gallery, London. Shows on both sides of the Atlantic followed. He became a master of the trompe-l'œil form and his work often reflected his obsessions with theatrical masks and sphinxes. Battersby also produced easel paintings and large scale murals and enjoyed the support of a wide group of patrons in the 1950s and 1960s. His first mural commission was from Lady Diana Duff Cooper in 1950, and other patrons included Audrey Pleydell-Bouverie, the Countess of Kenmare, Denis Martineau (for whom Battersby did seven panels at Mompesson House), Evelyn Waugh and John Profumo, as a present for his wife, Valerie Hobson.

Later life
From the 1960s onwards he began to develop his reputation as a collector, connoisseur and historian of the visual arts, decorating his home in Brighton in a typically lavish and eclectic way. He ran a boutique and printing studio named Sphinx Studio and in 1969, at the instigation of John Morley, his collection formed the basis for one of the first retrospectives of 1920s style when The Jazz Age was held. The exhibition was opened by Erté.

In 1971, Battersby's partner, Paul Watson, committed suicide.

In 1978, Battersby severed links with Brighton and his former interests, and moved to Fulham, London, where he continued to paint in preparation for a new exhibition that was to be held in 1982. He died, however, before the exhibition began.

Publications
The World of Art Nouveau, 1966.
Art Nouveau, 1969.
The Decorative Twenties, New York: Walker & Co., 1969.
The Decorative Thirties, 1971.
Art Deco Fashion, 1974.
Trompe L'OEil, 1974.

References

Further reading
"Martin Battersby, a memoir." by John Morley in The Journal of the Decorative Arts Society 1890-1940, No. 7.
"Sleight of eye" in Vogue, 15 February 1960.

External links
 
 A ‘New Look’ Interior: Martin Battersby’s decoration for Lady Diana Cooper
 The Jazz Age, An Entertainmen t, poster at the V&A

1914 births
1982 deaths
20th-century British painters
British male painters
British set decorators
Painters from London
Trompe-l'œil artists
Art Nouveau painters
20th-century British male artists